Sarcham-e Olya (also Romanized as Sarcham-e ‘Olyā; also known as Sarcham-e Bālā) is a village in Zanjanrud-e Pain Rural District, Zanjanrud District, Zanjan County, Zanjan Province, Iran. At the 2006 census, its population was 103, in 26 families.

References 

Populated places in Zanjan County